Fabio Reato (born 20 March 1993) is an Italian former professional footballer who plays as a defender.

Career
Born in L'Aquila, Abruzzo, Reato started his career at Lombard club A.C. Milan. In 2010–11 season he was a member of Berretti under-18 team. In 2011, he was signed by Pavia. In 2012, he was signed by Serie B club Cesena on a co-ownership deal with Pavia, for €150,000 transfer fee (César Meza Colli plus €75,000). He signed a 3-year contract.

Reato also returned to Pavia on a temporary deal in 2012–13 and 2013–14 Lega Pro Prima Divisione seasons. Cesena team-mate Matteo Zanini also joined Pavia along with Reato. In 2013 and again in 2014 the co-ownership deal were renewed.

In 2014, he left for Forlì along with L.Arrigoni, T.Arrigoni, N.Capellini, and M.Đurić. In June 2015 Cesena acquired Reato outright, as well as Pavia acquired Caio De Cenco outright.

References

External links
 AIC profile (data by football.it) 

Italian footballers
A.C. Milan players
F.C. Pavia players
A.C. Cesena players
Serie C players
Association football defenders
People from L'Aquila
Footballers from Abruzzo
1993 births
Living people
Sportspeople from the Province of L'Aquila